Sir Robert Fullerton (16 January 1773 – 6 June 1831) was a Scottish colonial administrator who served as the first Governor of the Straits Settlements, appointed by the East India Company.

Early life
He was born in Edinburgh the son of William Fullerton of Carstairs and raised on Nicolson Street in the city's south side. He was one of twelve children including his younger brother John Fullerton, Lord Fullerton.

Personal life

His elder sister Elizabeth married William Fullerton Elphinstone, a director of the East India Company. This influential connection probably contributed greatly to his career.

Penang (1824–1830)

Fullerton received his original appointment on 4 February 1824 and was governor of Prince of Wales Isle from 20 August 1824 to 1826, after which he became the governor of the newly incorporated Straits Settlements of Singapore (including Christmas Island and the Cocos-Keeling group), Penang (including Province Wellesley), and Malacca under the British administration in India. The governor of the Straits Settlements was assisted by three resident councillors; the resident councillor of Penang, the resident councillor of Malacca and the resident councillor of Singapore.

Robert Fullerton became the first governor of the Straits Settlements, based in Penang, and served in that capacity from 27 November 1826 to 12 November 1830. The departure of the last governor is also recorded in the Gazette. The issue of 29 August 1830 carries the following notification:

"The Honorable the Governor, being about to proceed to Singapore and Malacca, NOTICE is hereby given that this station will cease to be the seat of Government from the date of his departure, and the charge of the settlement will devolve upon the Honorable Robert Ibbetson, Resident Councillor; to whom all local references will be made."

He is credited with the creation of the municipal system in the Straits Settlements – Buckley stated that the first trace of subsequent municipalities can be traced to 1827. Fullerton, with the sanction of the Court of Directors and Board of Control, regulated for the appointment of "The Committee of Assessors," for the purposes of ensuring the streets of Penang were cleared, watched and kept in repair.

He died in London, England in 1831.

Legacy

See also
Governor of Penang
The Fullerton Hotel Singapore

References

External links
Biography of Robert Fullerton
Biography on Singapore Infopedia

1773 births
1831 deaths
Governors of Penang
Governors of the Straits Settlements
Administrators in British Singapore